Bykovo is a rural locality (a selo) in Kabansky District, Republic of Buryatia, Russia. The population was 230 as of 2010. There are 3 streets.

Geography 
Bykovo is located 39 km northeast of Kabansk (the district's administrative centre) by road. Shergino is the nearest rural locality.

References 

Rural localities in Kabansky District